William "Wally" Webb (4 July 1882 – 1949) was a British bantamweight boxer who competed in the early twentieth century. He won a bronze medal in boxing at the 1908 Summer Olympics losing against John Condon in the semi-finals.

References

External links
 

1882 births
1949 deaths
Bantamweight boxers
Olympic boxers of Great Britain
Boxers at the 1908 Summer Olympics
Olympic bronze medallists for Great Britain
Place of birth missing
Olympic medalists in boxing
British male boxers
Medalists at the 1908 Summer Olympics